The Cuckoo (translit. Kukuška) is a 2002 Russian war comedy drama film directed by Aleksandr Rogozhkin. It takes place during World War II, and the action is seen from the opposing perspectives of a Soviet soldier and a Finnish soldier stranded together at a Sami woman's farmhouse. It received generally positive reviews from critics.

Plot
In September 1944, in the final moments of the Continuation War against the Soviet Union, Veikko (Ville Haapasalo), a Finnish soldier, is turned in by his German compatriots for being in their eyes a would-be deserter. As punishment, the young man is placed in shackles, chained to a rock outcrop in a remote Lapland forest, and left with nothing but a few supplies and a Karabiner 98k rifle and ammunition - effectively forced to be a Kamikaze kukushka sniper. To ensure his willingness to fight, they dress him in the uniform of the German Waffen-SS, as Soviet soldiers feel little mercy towards SS men. Days pass, and after several failed attempts, Veikko succeeds in freeing himself; and he heads for safety, shackles still attached.

Meanwhile, Ivan (Viktor Bychkov), a captain in the Red Army accused of anti-Soviet correspondence, is arrested by the NKVD secret police. En route to his court martial, Soviet planes accidentally bomb the vehicle carrying the disgraced captain, killing the driver and Ivan's guard. Veikko, at this stage still chained to the rock, witnesses the bombing through his rifle scope.

Not far away is the farm of Anni (Anni-Kristiina Juuso), a Sámi reindeer farmer whose husband was taken away together with their whole reindeer herd by Germans four years earlier, never to return. Hungry and alone, the young and resourceful widow locates the bodies of Ivan and his captors while foraging for food. As she begins to bury the dead, Anni discovers that Ivan is still alive, but seriously hurt. She carries him to her wooden hut and nurses him back to health. Meanwhile, Veikko, in search of tools to remove his shackles, stumbles upon Anni’s farm.

None of the three characters speaks either of the others' languages. Comic and sometimes tragic misunderstandings soon arise, resulting in passionate relationships. Unable to communicate with the others and unaware that the war between the USSR and Finland is over, Ivan is convinced that Veikko is a German soldier gone astray. To Ivan, the German uniform the Finnish soldier was forced to wear is further proof. Ivan even refuses to tell Veikko his name, answering only "Poshol ty!" («Пошёл ты!» "Get lost!") — as a result, the two others think Ivan's name is "Psholty". Veikko is unaware of Ivan’s hatred and just wants to cut off his shackles, return home and put the war behind him, but opts to stay on Anni's farm to avoid falling into enemy hands. The earthy and sensuous Anni, who has not been with a man in four years, could not be more delighted with her good fortune, disregarding the language barrier between them.

For Anni, Veikko and Ivan are not enemies, but just men. Uncommon and touching bonds develop, as the three unlikely souls begin a domestic routine of hunting and gathering in preparation for the long Lapp winter. The two men do what they can to contribute to Anni’s well-being. Veikko builds a sauna and Ivan picks mushrooms. Veikko, Ivan, and Anni communicate only with gestures. Starved for love and physical touch, Anni seduces young, strapping Veikko, much to the chagrin of jealous, middle-aged Ivan.

Not long afterwards a Soviet biplane crashes in the forest near Anni’s hut, spilling leaflets announcing an armistice between Finland and the USSR. Veikko thinks he can finally return home safely; but Ivan, who does not understand Finnish, manages to find a pistol in the wreckage; and still convinced that Veikko is an enemy, shoots him when Veikko apparently tries to attack Ivan, when Veikko really only tried to destroy Ivan's rifle. When Ivan reads the last line of the leaflet the plane was dropping (written in Russian and instructing Soviet soldiers to allow the Finns to return home unharmed), he realizes that the war is over. Ivan is torn with remorse; and, stumbling, carries Veikko back to the farm.

The nurturing Anni brings Veikko back from the brink of death through a series of ancient Sami magic rituals. With Veikko bedridden, Anni’s needs for companionship and sexual longing draw Ivan into her bed. Gradually, Ivan and Veikko, no longer separated by ethnic hate or by rivalry for the affections of Anni, become friends. As winter arrives and the two men head back to their respective homes in opposite directions, Anni is left behind with memories, and much more, of her two men. In the final scene, she narrates the story to her children, whom she has named after their fathers: Veikko and Psholty.

Cast
 Anni-Kristiina Juuso — Anni, Sami woman
 Ville Haapasalo — Veikko, Finnish sniper
 Viktor Bychkov — Captain Ivan Kartuzov ("Psholty")

Crew
 Director: Aleksander V. Rogozhkin
 Screenplay: Aleksander V. Rogozhkin
 Director of Photography: Andrey Zhegalov (
 Film Art: Vladimir I. Svetozarov (
 Composer: Dmitriy Pavlov (

Reception

Critical response
Based on 63 reviews collected by Rotten Tomatoes, The Cuckoo has an overall approval rating from critics of 87%, with an average score of 7.02/10. The website's critical consensus states, "A sweet and amusing comedy". On Metacritic, the film has a weighted average score of 69 out of 100, based on 27 critics, indicating "generally favorable reviews".

Awards
 June 2002 - 24th Moscow International Film Festival - presented as a part of the competition program
 Prize "Silver Saint George" - Best Director
 Prize "Silver Saint George" - Best Actor - Ville Haapasalo
 Viewers' Choice Prize
 Prize FIPPRESSI
 Russia's Cinema Club Federation Prize
 July 2002 - X Festival of the Festivals in Saint Petersburg - Grand Prize "Golden Griffin" - best film
 August 2002 - X Film Festival "Window to Europe" in Vyborg - presented as a part of the competition program
 Grand Prize - best film
 Prize for the best female actor- Anni-Kristiina Juuso
 1 - 2nd place ( with film "The Star") in the external nomination "Vyborg's Count"
 October 2002 - International film festival "Europa Cinema" in Viareggio, Italy - presented as a part of the competition program
 Main Prize - best film
 Prize - best director
 December 2002 — 3 awards Golden Aries of the National Guild of Film Critics and Film Press:
 best film of the year
 best screenplay
 best female actor
 February 2003 - 4 awards "Golden Eagle":
 best film of the year
 best director
 best screenplay
 best male actor - Viktor Bychkov
 March 2003 - 4 awards Nika:
 best movie of the year
 best director
 best female actor
 best film artist
 2003 -  International Film Festival in Troy, Portugal
 Prize for the best film
 Prize for the best female actor
 2003 — International Film Festival in San Francisco — Viewers' Choice Prize
 2003 — XI Russian Film Festival in Onfler, France
 Grand Prize best film
 Best male actor - Viktor Bychkov
 Prize for the best female actor - Anni-Kristiina Juuso

In June 2004, a Russian Federation National Award in Art and Literature Area was awarded to the crew of the film: to the director and the author of the screenplay, Aleksandr Rogozhkin; producer Segei Selianov; main cast Anni-Kristiina Juuso, Ville Haapasalo, and Viktor Bychkov; director of photography Andrey Zhegalov; director of the film art Vladimir I. Svetozarov; composer Dmitriy Pavlov; and sound engineers Anatoliy Gudkov and Sergei Sokolov.

References

External links
The Cuckoo at Sony Classics

2002 films
Russian multilingual films
2000s Finnish-language films
Sámi-language films
2000s Russian-language films
Films set in 1944
Films set in Finland
Films shot in Russia
2002 comedy-drama films
Anti-war films about World War II
Films directed by Aleksandr Rogozhkin
Sun in a Net Awards winners (films)
Russian war comedy films
Russian comedy-drama films
Russian World War II films
2002 multilingual films